The Buffalo Bandits are a lacrosse team based in Buffalo, New York playing in the National Lacrosse League (NLL). The 2019 season is their 28th season in the NLL

Regular season

Final standings

Game log
Reference:

Playoffs

Roster

Entry Draft
The 2018 NLL Entry Draft took place on September 25, 2018. The Bandits made the following selections:

See also
2019 NLL season

References

Buffalo
Buffalo Bandits seasons
Buffalo Bandits